2017 Lashkargah bombing may refer to:

January 2017 Afghanistan bombings, one of which was in Lashkargah
June 2017 Lashkargah bombing